The Belarusian Social Democratic Party (Assembly) is a social-democratic political party in Belarus that opposes the government of president Alexander Lukashenko.

History 
The party was founded in 2005 after the split within the BSDP (People's Assembly). It considers itself the successor of the historical Belarusian Socialist Assembly founded in 1902. Alaksandar Kazulin, a former rector of Belarusian State University, became the first party leader of the new registered party. The BSDP (People's Assembly) remained without registration and office.

At the legislative elections in 13–17 October 2004, the party did not secure any seats. These elections fell significantly short of OSCE commitments, according to the OSCE/ODIHR Election Observation Mission . Its candidate at the presidential election of 2006, Alaksandar Kazulin, won 2.3% of the vote.

In 2011, Iryna Veshtard was elected as the new chairman of the party.

Ideology and goals of the party
The Belarusian Social Democratic Party belongs to the community of parties associated with the Socialist International. BSDP focuses on Western European social-democratic ideology and is supported by various Western European social democratic parties. The main task of the country's foreign party promotes not only the entry of Belarus into the European Union and NATO, but also promotes the accession of Russia, Ukraine and Moldova.

Electoral history

Presidential elections

Legislative elections

Leadership

See also
Belarusian Social Democratic Assembly
Belarusian Social Democratic Party (People's Assembly)
Social Democratic Party of Popular Accord

History of Belarusian social-democratic parties

References

External links
 
OSCE/ODIHR Election Observation Mission, Final Report of the Republic of Belarus Parliamentary Elections, 17 October 2004

 
2005 establishments in Belarus
Political parties established in 2005
Political parties in Belarus